Hell Raiders is a 1969 American made-for-television war film directed by Larry Buchanan. It was one of several movies he made for AIP that were remakes of earlier AIP movies – in this case, Suicide Battalion (1958).

References

External links

1968 films
American International Pictures films
American war films
Italian Campaign of World War II films
Films directed by Larry Buchanan
1960s American films